Bull is a 2021 British crime thriller film written and directed by Paul Andrew Williams.  The film stars Neil Maskell as the titular character seeking revenge on his former gang associates and father-in-law to get his son.

Premise 
Bull is a contract killer. Ten years ago, Bull's boss and father-in-law, Norm, took extreme measures to separate him from his son, Aiden. Bull returns to town to exact his revenge; one by one, hunting each one down a treacherous path of love and vengeance of biblical proportions.

Cast 
 Neil Maskell as Bull
 David Hayman as Norm
 Tamzin Outhwaite as Sharon
 Lois Brabin-Platt as Gemma

Original soundtrack 

Bull (Original Motion Picture Soundtrack) is the soundtrack album to the film. It features music entirely composed and produced by English electronic music artist Raffertie.

Production and release
Bull was written and directed by Paul Andrew Williams and set up the launch of Giant Productions for producer Dominic Tighe.

Bull has its world premiere at the Fantasia Film Festival in Montreal on 6 August 2021 and then screened at the BFI London Film Festival before wider release in the United Kingdom on 5 November 2021.  At the 2021 American Film Market, Saban Films picked up the North American distribution rights, planning for release in the second quarter of 2022.

Reception 
On the review aggregator website Rotten Tomatoes, 93% of 40 critics' reviews are positive, with an average rating of 7.3/10. The website's critical consensus reads, "Bull isn't for the faint of heart, but this down and dirty revenge thriller packs a charge for fans of old-school crime dramas." Metacritic, which uses a weighted average, assigned the film a score of 72 out of 100 based on nine critics, indicating "generally favorable reviews".

Ian Freer of Empire wrote, "Paul Andrew Williams and Neil Maskell breathe new life into a familiar one-man-army scenario."

References

External links 
 
 

British films about revenge
2021 films
2021 thriller films
2020s English-language films